NATIONAL PROGRAMME ON TECHNOLOGY ENHANCED LEARNING  NPTEL is a quality Indian e-learning platform for university-level science, technology, engineering, and mathematics (STEM) subjects. It is jointly developed by Indian Institutes of Technology and Indian Institute of Science. The initiative is funded by the Ministry of Education (MoE) , Government of India. The project's central idea is to put recorded lectures taught by its member institutes online for open access. It operates one of the most extensive educational Youtube channel covering engineering, basic sciences, and some humanities and social science subjects.

History and About 
NPTEL was launched in 2003 by seven IITs Bombay, Delhi, Kanpur, Kharagpur, Madras, Guwahati and Roorkee and Indian Institute of Science (IISc). Since March 2014, NPTEL began offering courses along with in-centre and proctored certification examinations. Course credits can also be transferred to HEIs/ Universities/ student Academic Bank of Credits (ABC) under the UGC guidelines. It is the largest e-repository in the world of courses in engineering, basic sciences and selected humanities and management subjects. The initiative runs through MOOCs model so that students outside IIT system can also participate in learning quality content and get certified provided they meet the passing criteria in the exams conducted at the end of the NPTEL semesters. All courses are free to enrol and learn from. The certification exam is optional and comes at a fee of Rs 1000 per course exam.

The headquarter of NPTEL is located inside IIT Madras.

Some Important External links 

 https://nptel.ac.in 
 swayam.gov.in 
 IITs 
 IISc Bangalore

References

 Ministry of Education (India)
E-learning
Indian educational websites